The Piliny culture was a Bronze Age culture in northern Hungary and Slovakia that existed from about 1300 to 700 B.C. It was part of the Urnfield culture.

References

Urnfield culture
Bronze Age cultures of Europe
Archaeological cultures of Central Europe
Archaeological cultures in Hungary
Archaeological cultures in Slovakia
Articles needing translation from Polish Wikipedia